Pierre-Macario Saba (born on 14 February 1873 in Aleppo, Syria - died on 28 July 1943) was Archbishop of the Melkite Greek Catholic Archeparchy of Aleppo in Syria.

Life

Saba was ordained as a priest on March 3, 1898. On 29 November 1903 he received a simultaneous appointment as auxiliary bishop in Alexandria, Egypt and Titular Bishop of Palmyra, Syria. Patriarch Cyril VIII Geha of Antioch consecrated him on the same day to the bishop. His co-consecrators were Archbishop Gaudenzio Bonfigli, OFM (Titular Bishop of Cabasa and Apostolic Delegate of Egypt) and Bishop Joseph Dumani, BS from Tripoli, Lebanon.

On June 25, 1919, Saba was appointed Archbishop of Aleppo, which he remained until his death.

References

External links
 http://www.catholic-hierarchy.org/bishop/bsabam.html

1873 births
1943 deaths
Melkite Greek Catholic bishops
People from Aleppo
20th-century Eastern Catholic archbishops
19th-century Syrian people
20th-century Syrian people
19th-century Eastern Catholic clergy
Syrian Melkite Greek Catholics
Eastern Catholic bishops in the Ottoman Empire
Eastern Catholic bishops in Syria